The following is a list of NABF champions, showing every champion certificated by the North American Boxing Federation (NABF), in operation since 1969.

r – Champion relinquished title.
s – Champion stripped of title.

Heavyweight

Cruiserweight

Light heavyweight

Super middleweight

Middleweight

Super welterweight

Welterweight

Super lightweight

Lightweight

Super featherweight

Featherweight

References

External links
Official website for the NABF

Boxing in North America
Lists of boxing champions
World Boxing Council